Halifax North was a provincial electoral district in Nova Scotia, Canada, that elected one member of the Nova Scotia House of Assembly. It was formed in 1933 when Halifax County was divided into five distinct electoral districts. In 1966, Halifax North was divided into Halifax City Northeast and Halifax City Northwest. The following year, these districts were renamed to become Halifax Needham and Halifax Chebucto, respectively.

Members of the Legislative Assembly 
Halifax North elected the following members to the Legislative Assembly:

Election results

1933 general election

1937 general election

1941 general election

1945 general election

1949 general election

1953 general election

1956 general election

1960 general election

1963 general election

References

Former provincial electoral districts of Nova Scotia